Vanaja is a former municipality of Finland. It is also speculated that it might have been the name for an Iron Age and early Middle Ages settlement found opposite to the Häme Castle.

The municipality bordered Hämeenlinna, Hattula, Hauho, Tuulos, Lammi, Janakkala and Renko. Before 1948, it bordered Hämeenlinnan maalaiskunta instead of Hattula.

History

Iron Age Finnish settlement
Vanaja is a name commonly used about the excavation site of an Iron Age settlement in central Tavastia, Finland, opposite to the later Häme Castle in Varikonniemi. According to some interpretations it was a proto-urban settlement, but this is contested. The settlement existed roughly during the 6th to 13th centuries. It is possibly the "town of Vanai" mentioned once in a Novgorod chronicle that describes how it was destroyed by Novgorodian forces in 1311 CE.

It has been suggested that the site was abandoned after the attack. As another possible result from the war, the present-day Häme Castle was built on the opposite shore of the Vanajavesi lake soon (some researchers, however, have dated the earliest building phase of the castle to the late 13th century). It took however more than 300 years before there was a town next to it again: Hämeenlinna was established 1639.

According to preliminary estimations, the site was about  hectares making it about half the size of the Björkö settlement in Sweden. Excavations have so far covered only a small fraction of the area, and its nature as a town-like settlement or just an ordinary rural site has been disputed. The site was found in 1986.

Vanaja afterwards 

Vanaja parish was first mentioned in 1324, 13 years after the Novgorod invasion.

The Vanaja parish used to cover all of the area around the Häme castle. The administrative division was also known as Mäskälä after the village of Mäskälä. The town of Hämeenlinna was established in 1639 around the castle. The two had separate parishes until they were merged in 1803, being separated again in 1904. At the same time, the territories of the Hämeenlinna parish that were not parts of the town itself became Hämeenlinnan maalaiskunta, which in 1948 was divided between Hämeenlinna, Vanaja and Renko. Vanaja was divided between Hämeenlinna, Janakkala, Renko and Hattula in 1967. Most of the municipality is now part of Hämeenlinna, as Renko was merged into Hämeenlinna in 2009.

The oldest Swedish name (Vaan-ö) of the municipality probably originated from the name of the cape, which during springtime floods used to be an island. There was an episcopal manor nearby in the 14th and 15th century.

References 

Former municipalities of Finland
Medieval Finland
Archaeological sites in Finland
History of Kanta-Häme
Hämeenlinna
Hattula
Janakkala
Former populated places in Finland